St. Bede's Grammar School, in Heaton, Bradford, West Yorkshire, England, was a Roman Catholic boys' Secondary school. The school merged with St. Joseph's Catholic College in September 2014 to form St Bede's and St Joseph's Catholic College. The school is based over both of the former school sites.

School history

Grammar school
St. Bede's Grammar School opened on 12 June 1900, in  Drewton Street, Bradford.  Its first Headmaster was Rev. Dr. Arthur Hinsley, later Rector of the Venerable English College, Rome, Apostolic Delegate to Africa, and Cardinal Archbishop of Westminster (1935–1943).

In 1919 the school was moved to its present site at Heaton Hall. The old Hall, home of the Rosse family, proved unsatisfactory as the number of pupils continued to grow and a new school was opened in 1939. Since then many additions and alterations have been made to the accommodation. A new technical wing was built in the 1950s, a new refectory and sixth form centre were added in the 1960s.

Comprehensive
The school has had comprehensive status since the 1960s, and was no longer a grammar school. A Maths/English block was built in the 1970s. New Science laboratories were opened in 2001 and new ICT facilities were provided. By 2008 a new sports hall was opened by Labour Minister for Sports (at the time) Gerry Sutcliffe.  A new extension containing new offices and classrooms was built in the late 2000s.

From 2008 the school had one federated governing body with St Joseph's Catholic College and Yorkshire Martyrs Catholic College and when Yorkshire Martyrs closed in 2010 the boys transferred to St Bede's.  An Executive Headteacher was appointed in 2009 to oversee both St Bede's and St Joseph's.

Merger
The school merged with St. Joseph's Catholic College in September 2014 to form St Bede's and St Joseph's Catholic College. The former St. Bede's is now used as the upper school site of the new school.

Sixth Form
St Bede's shared an associated sixth form with St. Joseph's Catholic College for many years.  In 2008 the sixth forms of St Bede's and St Joseph's joined with the sixth form of Yorkshire Martyrs Catholic College to form the Bradford Catholic Sixth Form.  When Yorkshire Martyrs closed in 2010 the sixth form transferred to St Bede's and St Joseph's and in 2011 the Sixth Form was renamed St Benedict's Sixth Form.

Notable former pupils

Comprehensive
Paul Bolland, footballer
Mark Bower, footballer
Joe Cooke (footballer)
Danny Devine, footballer
Nick Doody, comedian and writer
Barry Gallagher, footballer
Roly Gregoire, Sunderland F.C. footballer
Dave Halley, rugby league player
Wayne Heseltine, footballer
Andy Kiwomya, footballer
Chris Kiwomya, footballer
Stepan Lucyszyn, Professor, Imperial College London
Danny Verity, footballer

Grammar school

 Desmond Albrow, Assistant Editor from 1976-87 of The Sunday Telegraph, and Editor from 1966-71 of the Catholic Herald
 John Braine, novelist, first of the angry young men, whose 1957 book Room at the Top became a 1959 film, the first kitchen-sink film, and received six Oscar nominations, winning Best Actress for Simone Signoret in the 1959 Oscars 
 Lord Brennan, lawyer and Labour parliamentarian, President from 1964-65 of the University of Manchester Students' Union, and President from 2001-14 of the Catholic Union of Great Britain, and from 2008-13 of Canning House
 Alfred John Brown (writer) 
 Johnnie Casson, comedian
 Monsignor Bernard Doyle, former headmaster of St Thomas Aquinas Grammar School in Leeds (now Cardinal Heenan Catholic High School)
 Alfred J. Brown topographical writer, novelist and poet.
 John Hellawell, footballer, younger brother of Mike
 Mike Hellawell, footballer, played two international games for England in 1962
 Bernard Hepton, well-known actor in the 1970s for the Kommandant in Colditz and Albert Foiret in Secret Army (1977–79), and for Toby Esterhase in the 1979 Tinker Tailor Soldier Spy
 Mick Hopkinson, canoeist, (first expedition to canoe down Everest)
 Geoff Lister CBE, Chief Executive from 1985-95 of the Bradford & Bingley building society, Chairman from 1993-94 of the Building Societies Association
 Prof Paul Madden FRS, Provost since 2008 of The Queen's College, Oxford, Joseph Black Professor of Chemistry from 2006-08 at the University of Oxford
 Peter Marks CBE (1961–67), Chief Executive from 2007-13 of The Co-operative Group, and from 2002-07 of United Co-operatives
 Martin McEvoy, opera singer
 Paul McKee (mathematician), established election-night TV presentations in 1964, and throughout the 1970s and 1980s, on ITN, with David Nicholas, and deputy chief executive from 1977-89 of Yorkshire Television
 Rt Rev Gerald Moverley, Bishop of Hallam (Roman Catholic Diocese of Hallam in South Yorkshire) from 1980–96
 Stephen Murgatroyd, academic in Canada
 Prof John Murray CBE FDSRCS FMedSci, Dean of Dentistry from 1992-2002 at School of Dental Sciences, Newcastle University, and Professor of Child Health from 1977–92
 John Northard CBE FREng, Chairman from 1991-93 of British Coal, President from 1982-83 of the Institution of Mining and Metallurgy 
 John Riley-Schofield (John Riley), baritone (German Wikipedia link)
 Smokie, 1970s pop music group
 Antony G. Sweeney, deputy director from 1991-2004 of the National Museum of Photography, Film & Television

See also
 St Bede's College, Manchester
 former Bede Grammar School for Boys, became Sunderland College

References

External links
 St Bede's Grammar School
 St Bede's and St Joseph's Catholic College

1900 establishments in England
Defunct Catholic schools in the Diocese of Leeds
Defunct grammar schools in England
Defunct schools in the City of Bradford
Educational institutions established in 1900
Educational institutions disestablished in 2014
Schools in Bradford
2014 disestablishments in England